Take the Plunge was an early evening game show that was produced by Thames Television and aired on the ITV network for one series between 4 October and 6 December 1989. The programme was hosted by comedy actress Su Pollard.

The show's format was loosely based on an American game show called Blackout, as well as a Spanish game show called Sin Verguenza.

References

External links

1989 British television series debuts
1989 British television series endings
1980s British game shows
ITV game shows
Television series by Fremantle (company)
Television shows produced by Thames Television
English-language television shows